Georgi Nikolov (born 5 June 1983 in Sofia) is a Bulgarian footballer who last played for Marek Dupnitsa as a defender.

Career
Nikolov is 1.93 m tall and weighs 81 kg. He had previously played for Beroe Stara Zagora, Marek Dupnitsa, Belasitsa Petrich and Lokomotiv Sofia. Nikolov was raised in Septemvri Sofia's youths teams.

External links
 

1983 births
Living people
Bulgarian footballers
First Professional Football League (Bulgaria) players
PFC Beroe Stara Zagora players
PFC Belasitsa Petrich players
FC Lokomotiv 1929 Sofia players
PFC Marek Dupnitsa players
Association football defenders